Brens is the name of several communes in France:

 Brens, Ain, in the Ain département
 Brens, Tarn, in the Tarn département